Storm Eva (also called Chuck, Staffan and other names) was the fifth named storm of the Met Office and Met Éireann's Name our Storms project. Heavy rainfall from Eva occurred around three weeks after Storm Desmond had brought severe flooding to parts of Northern England, exacerbating the ongoing situation. The low pressure was named Chuck by the Free University of Berlin and Staffan by the Swedish Meteorological Institute.

Meteorological history

Forecasts
Eva was the fifth storm to be officially named by Met Éireann on 22 December 2015. An orange wind warning was issued for counties Clare, Galway, Mayo, Sligo and Donegal on the same day. Gales were also expected in the northwest of the United Kingdom, with storm force winds over parts of the Outer Hebrides. There were fears that the storm could cause further disruption to Cumbria in England, where areas were already dealing with the aftermath of flooding from Storm Desmond and in some cases had been flooded twice already. The army and Environment Agency staff were called in to be on stand-by to bolster flood defences.

Impact

Rain associated with the passage of Eva caused disruption when rivers burst their banks in the Cumbrian towns of Appleby, Keswick and Kendal on the 22 December. Appleby received three to four feet of flood water. The village of Glenridding was flooded for the third time in the month. Six thousand houses in Ireland were left without power. In London, Secretary of State for Environment, Food and Rural Affairs Liz Truss convened a COBRA meeting to decide on emergency measures, which included the deployment of soldiers from the 2nd Battalion, Duke of Lancaster's Regiment to the affected areas. Ferries operating between Dublin and Holyhead were cancelled due to bad weather on the Irish Sea.

Notes

References

2015 floods in the United Kingdom
Events in England
Eva
2015 disasters in the United Kingdom
Eva
2015 meteorology
December 2015 events in Europe